The 1937 Hardin–Simmons Cowboys football team was an American football team that represented Hardin–Simmons University as an independent during the 1937 college football season. In its third season under head coach Frank Kimbrough, the team compiled an 8–0–1 record and shut out five of nine opponents.

Schedule

References

Hardin-Simmons
Hardin–Simmons Cowboys football seasons
College football undefeated seasons
Hardin-Simmons Cowboys football